80th parallel may refer to:

80th parallel north, a circle of latitude in the Northern Hemisphere
80th parallel south, a circle of latitude in the Southern Hemisphere